The 2019 Hyderabad Open (officially known as the IDBI Federal Life Insurance Hyderabad Open 2019 for sponsorship reasons) was a badminton tournament which took place at G. M. C. Balayogi SATS Indoor Stadium in Hyderabad, India, from 6 to 11 August 2019 and had a total purse of $75,000.

Tournament
The 2019 Hyderabad Open was the fifth Super 100 tournament of the 2019 BWF World Tour and also part of the Hyderabad Open championships, which had been held since 2018. This tournament was organized by the Badminton Association of India and sanctioned by the BWF.

Venue
This international tournament was held at G. M. C. Balayogi SATS Indoor Stadium in Hyderabad, Telangana, India.

Point distribution
Below is the point distribution table for each phase of the tournament based on the BWF points system for the BWF Tour Super 100 event.

Prize money
The total prize money for this tournament was US$75,000. Distribution of prize money was in accordance with BWF regulations.

Men's singles

Seeds

 Sameer Verma (second round)
 B. Sai Praneeth (second round)
 Prannoy Kumar (second round)
 Parupalli Kashyap (third round)
 Subhankar Dey (quarter-finals)
 Shesar Hiren Rhustavito (third round)
 Sourabh Verma (champion)
 Firman Abdul Kholik (third round)

Finals

Top half

Section 1

Section 2

Bottom half

Section 3

Section 4

Women's singles

Seeds

 Yeo Jia Min (champion)
 An Se-young (final)
 Zhang Yiman (quarter-finals)
 Porntip Buranaprasertsuk (semi-finals)
 Ksenia Polikarpova (withdrew)
 Pai Yu-po (quarter-finals)
 Brittney Tam (second round) 
 Choirunnisa (first round)

Finals

Top half

Section 1

Section 2

Bottom half

Section 3

Section 4

Men's doubles

Seeds

 Satwiksairaj Rankireddy / Chirag Shetty (withdrew)
 Manu Attri / B. Sumeeth Reddy (quarter-finals)
 Bodin Isara / Maneepong Jongjit (first round)
 Lee Jhe-huei / Yang Po-hsuan (semi-finals)
 Ou Xuanyi / Zhang Nan (second round)
 Huang Kaixiang / Liu Cheng (quarter-finals)
 Pranav Chopra / Rohan Kapoor (first round)
 Arjun M.R. / Ramchandran Shlok (quarter-finals)

Finals

Top half

Section 1

Section 2

Bottom half

Section 3

Section 4

Women's doubles

Seeds

 Ashwini Ponnappa / N. Sikki Reddy (final)
 Émilie Lefel / Anne Tran (first round)
 Chayanit Chaladchalam / Phataimas Muenwong (withdrew)
 Ng Wing Yung / Yeung Nga Ting (second round)
 Ni Ketut Mahadewi Istarani / Tania Oktaviani Kusumah (first round)
 Setyana Mapasa / Gronya Somerville (withdrew)
 Pooja Dandu / Sanjana Santosh (second round)
 Meghana Jakkampudi / Poorvisha S. Ram (quarter-finals)

Finals

Top half

Section 1

Section 2

Bottom half

Section 3

Section 4

Mixed doubles

Seeds

 Pranav Chopra / N. Sikki Reddy (second round)
 Satwiksairaj Rankireddy / Ashwini Ponnappa (withdrew)
 Chen Tang Jie / Peck Yen Wei (second round)
 Joshua Hurlburt-Yu / Josephine Wu (second round)
 Mak Hee Chun / Chau Hoi Wah (withdrew)
 Saurabh Sharma / Anoushka Parikh (first round)
 Danny Bawa Chrisnanta / Tan Wei Han (withdrew)
 Rohan Kapoor / Kuhoo Garg (second round)

Finals

Top half

Section 1

Section 2

Bottom half

Section 3

Section 4

References

External links
 Tournament Link

Hyderabad Open (badminton)
Hyderabad Open
Hyderabad Open (badminton)
Hyderabad Open (badminton)